Bear Your Mind is the second studio album by Nashville punk rock band Free Throw. It was released on May 26, 2017, nearly three years after the band's previous album Those Days are Gone.

Composition

Lyrical content

According to Castro, Bear Your Mind "picks up where the old record left off." The vocalist explained, 

The album's title is derived from a lyric in the album's seventh track "Andy and I, Uhh...". Discussing the song's lyrics, Casto stated that the song is about of the album his struggles with anxiety and body image. That's where the title comes from. Castro stated "the lyrics flip back and forth between bearing something and mind and being 'bare' in mind", and in his mind it "just fit." He continued, "the album is about carrying the weight of personal burdens so I thought Bear Your Mind just made sense. The album art goes along well. The mannequin holding the television on its shoulder."

Music
The band's previous album was generally described as a Midwest emo album. Bear Your Mind was noted for its much more refined production value in comparison to its predecessor. Allmusic wrote that the added production value made room for "greater definition and nuance" that allowed the band to "transcend" standard tropes associated with the emo genre.

Reception
AllMusic gave the album an overall favorable review. Despite describing the guitar work as "clever" and the vocals as "solid," he said Bear Your Mind tucks neatly into the emo revival scene.

Personnel
Cory Castro - lead vocals, rhythm guitar 
Jake Hughes - rhythm guitar, backing vocals 
Lawrence Warner - lead guitar 
Justin Castro - bass 
Kevin Garcia - drums, backing vocals

References

2017 albums
Punk rock albums by American artists